Star Wars Day is an informal commemorative day observed annually on May4 to celebrate the Star Wars media franchise created by founder, former chairman and CEO of Lucasfilm, George Lucas. Observance of the day spread quickly through media and grassroots celebrations since the franchise began in 1977.

The date originated from the pun "May the Fourth be with you", a variant of the popular Star Wars catchphrase "May the Force be with you". Even though the holiday was not created or declared by Lucasfilm, many Star Wars fans around the world have chosen to celebrate the holiday. It has since been embraced by Lucasfilm and parent company Disney as an annual celebration of Star Wars.

Additionally, the release date of the original Star Wars movie on May 25, 1977 is also celebrated as Geek Pride Day.

History 
The first recorded reference of the phrase being used was on May 4, 1979, the day after Margaret Thatcher was elected as Prime Minister of the United Kingdom. Her political party, the Conservatives, placed a congratulatory advertisement in the London Evening News saying "May the Fourth Be with You, Maggie. Congratulations."

In the 1988 episode of Count Duckula, "The Vampire Strikes Back", a space-faring superhero, Tremendous Terrance, asks Duckula the date and is told, "May the Fourth". As Terrance departs, he tells all below, "May the Fourth be with you."

The phrase was used in a UK Parliament defence debate on May 4, 1994.

Astrophysicist and author Jeanne Cavelos used the saying on page 94 of her 1999 book The Science of Star Wars.

In 2008, the first Facebook groups appeared, celebrating Luke Skywalker Day, with the same catchphrase.

In 2011, the first organized celebration of Star Wars Day took place in Toronto, Ontario, Canada at the Toronto Underground Cinema. Produced by Sean Ward and Alice Quinn, festivities included an original trilogy trivia game show; a costume contest with celebrity judges; and the web's best tribute films, mash-ups, parodies, and remixes on the big screen. The second annual edition took place on Friday, May 4, 2012.

Fans (even government officials, such as Boris Johnson) have celebrated Star Wars in a variety of ways in social media and on television.

Major League Baseball, association football, and college sports teams have paid tribute to Star Wars in different ways. Minor League Baseball teams such as the Toledo Mud Hens and the Durham Bulls have worn special uniforms as part of Star Wars Day promotions.

On Star Wars Day 2015, astronauts in the International Space Station watched Star Wars. Also in 2015, the carillon bells inside the Peace Tower on Parliament Hill in Ottawa, Canada played "The Imperial March" theme from Star Wars, among other space-related tunes.

Official celebrations 
Since 2013, The Walt Disney Company has officially observed the holiday with several Star Wars events and festivities at Disneyland and Walt Disney World. Disney had purchased Lucasfilm, including the rights to Star Wars, in late 2012.

The finale of The Clone Wars was made available on Disney+ on May 4, 2020. Star Wars: The Rise of Skywalker, as well as the documentary series Disney Gallery: The Mandalorian, were also made available on Disney+ the same day. The animated series Star Wars: The Bad Batch also premiered on Disney+ on Star Wars Day in 2021. The second official trailer for Obi-Wan Kenobi was officially released on May 4, 2022 as well as Disney Gallery: The Book of Boba Fett.

Additional dates

Revenge of the Fifth/Sixth 

Some recognize the day after, May 5, as "Revenge of the Fifth", a play on Star Wars: Episode III – Revenge of the Sith and celebrate the Sith Lords and other villainous characters from the Star Wars series rather than the Jedi. Others celebrate this one day later, on May 6, citing "Revenge of the Sixth" as a better play on "Sith", while others refer to the 6th as "Return of the 6th" as a play on Return of the Jedi and the trilogy aspect of the Star Wars films.

May 25 
In honor of the 30th anniversary release date of Star Wars on May 25, 1977, the Los Angeles City Council declared May 25, 2007 as Star Wars Day. A separate initiative for observing Geek Pride Day on May 25 is based on the Star Wars connection along with ties to The Hitchhiker's Guide to the Galaxy (Towel Day) and Discworld. Solo: A Star Wars Story was also released on May 25, 2018, 41 years after the original Star Wars.

See also 
 Cinco de Mayo, a celebration held on May 5
 Free Comic Book Day, which occasionally falls on May 4
 Pi day, also based on the name of the date
Geek Pride Day, held on the release date of the first Star Wars

References

Further reading

External links 

 

 

Unofficial observances
Star Wars fandom
Puns
May observances
Recurring events established in 2011
2011 establishments in Ontario